Sham Kwok Keung Tailor (born 10 September 1985 in Hong Kong) is a former Hong Kong professional footballer who currently plays for Hong Kong First Division club Citizen.

He is the younger brother of footballer Sham Kwok Fai.

Club career

Happy Valley
Both Sham Kwok Keung and his older brother Sham Kwok Fai were youth products of Happy Valley. He was named the Best Young Player in the 2003-04 season. But since then his progress has been hampered by injuries. At the end of the 2005–06 season he underwent surgery for his knee and spent 3 months recuperating. He regained a starting position but then twisted his ankle and broke half of his tendon, ending his season. The injuries caused him to change his shirt number from 12 to 13.

Shatin
Sham Kwok Keung joined Shatin in the 2009-10 season, after Happy Valley was relegated. He scored a goal in the 7th minute against Tai Po to help the team win its first game by 4–1 on 24 October 2009.

Shatin SA was relegated at the end of the season. Sham Kwok Keung thus moved to Citizen to replace Xu Deshuai who moved to South China.

Citizen
Sham scored the second goal with a header, from brother Sham Kwok Fai's cross, for Citizen and helped the team overcome a 0–3 deficit in the 2010-11 Hong Kong Senior Challenge Shield final against South China, to eventually tie the match 3–3. Citizen went on to win the penalty shoot-out by 4–2 to win the trophy and qualified for the 2012 AFC Cup.

In the league, on 19 December 2010, Sham Kwok Keung scored against Kitchee to earn a 1–1 draw for Citizen. In April 2011, he scored the only goal in Citizen's 1–0 win over Tai Chung FC. In all he scored 6 goals for Citizen in the 2010–11 league season.

On 17 November 2011, he was diagnosed with a broken rib, sustained in the match in October against Tuen Mun when he was hit in the chest, and had to rest for 3 weeks. He did not therefore play against league champions Kitchee on 20 November 2011. On 6 January 2012, Sham Kwok Keung scored a header in the 85th minute against South China to make it 3–2 to Citizen, but later he was sent off for two bookable offences. The matched ended 3–3.

International career

Hong Kong U-23
Sham played in the 2006 Asian Games for Hong Kong. He scored a goal in the 8th minute against Iran national under-23 football team, but Hong Kong eventually lost the match 1–2.

Sham Kwok Keung was a member of the Hong Kong national under-23 football team for the 2008 Beijing Olympics Asian qualifiers. He scored a goal with a bicycle kick and provided an assist to Chan Siu Ki to score and win the game 3–0 in the qualifying match away to Bangladesh. Hong Kong lost the home leg 0–1 but still proceeded to the next round.

Hong Kong
In a 2007 AFC Asian Cup qualifying game, Sham Kwok Keung appeared as a substitute for Hong Kong against Uzbekistan and scored two goals at the 66th and 87th minute, to help Hong Kong gain a point from the game, thus keeping Hong Kong's hopes alive for qualification. Sham Kwok Keung received great praise from coach Lai Sun Cheung after the match for his contribution. On 2 October 2011, Sham Kwok Keung scored two goals for Hong Kong in the 2011 Long Teng Cup against Macau to help Hong Kong win the match by 5–1. He was then sent off after two bookable offences in the last match against Chinese Taipei, but Hong Kong still won 6–0.

Guangdong-Hong Kong Cup
In the 2011 Guangdong–Hong Kong Cup, Guangdong won its home leg 3–1. Sham Kwok Keung scored the equalising goal in the return leg and Hong Kong drew the match 1–1, but Hong Kong lost the tie 4–2.

Honours

Club
Happy Valley
Hong Kong First Division: 2003–04, 2005–06
Hong Kong Senior Shield: 2003–04
Hong Kong FA Cup: 2003–04

Citizen
Hong Kong Senior Shield: 2010–11

Kitchee
Hong Kong Premier League: 2016–17
Hong Kong Senior Shield: 2016–17
Hong Kong FA Cup: 2016–17
Hong Kong League Cup: 2015–16

Individual
Hong Kong Senior Shield Top Scorer: 2003–04

Career statistics

Club
As of 18 August 2006

International
As of 16 October 2012

References

External links
Sham Kwok Keung at HKFA

1985 births
Living people
Hong Kong footballers
Hong Kong international footballers
Association football midfielders
Happy Valley AA players
Citizen AA players
Kitchee SC players
Hong Kong First Division League players
Hong Kong Premier League players
Footballers at the 2006 Asian Games
Asian Games competitors for Hong Kong
Hong Kong League XI representative players